The Boggy Formation is a geologic formation in Arkansas and Oklahoma. It preserves fossils dating back to the Carboniferous period.

Paleontology
Amithorthoceras
A. unicamera
Arkbuckleoceras
A. tricamerae
Bitaunioceras
B. buckhornense
Cyrtorthoracoceras?
Dolorthoceras
D. boggyense
Pseudorthoceras
P. knoxense
Sueroceras
S. oklahomense
Sulphurnites
S. taffi
Unklesbayoceras
U. striatulum

See also

 List of fossiliferous stratigraphic units in Arkansas
 List of fossiliferous stratigraphic units in Oklahoma
 Paleontology in Arkansas
 Paleontology in Oklahoma

References

 

Carboniferous Arkansas
Carboniferous geology of Oklahoma
Carboniferous southern paleotropical deposits